Paul Jacquier (26 March 1879 – 3 March 1961) was a French senator.

Positions
MP of Haute-Savoie from 1909 to 1919 and from 1924 to 1935
Senator of Haute-Savoie from 1935 to 1940
Undersecretary of State for Fine Arts on Dec. 9 1913 to 9 June 1914 in the government of Gaston Doumergue
Undersecretary of State for the Interior on June 14, 1914 to October 29, 1915 in the governments of René Viviani and René Viviani
Undersecretary of State for Finance of 19 to 23 July 1926 in the government of Edouard Herriot
Minister of Labour on November 8, 1934 at 1 June 1935 in the government of Pierre-Étienne Flandin
Minister of Agriculture from 1 to 7 June 1935 in the government of Fernand Bouisson

References

1879 births
1961 deaths
Politicians from Bordeaux
Radical Party (France) politicians
French Ministers of Agriculture
Members of the 9th Chamber of Deputies of the French Third Republic
Members of the 10th Chamber of Deputies of the French Third Republic
Members of the 11th Chamber of Deputies of the French Third Republic
Members of the 13th Chamber of Deputies of the French Third Republic
Members of the 14th Chamber of Deputies of the French Third Republic
Members of the 15th Chamber of Deputies of the French Third Republic
French Senators of the Third Republic
Senators of Haute-Savoie